Vega is a town district in Haninge Municipality, in Sweden. As of 2017, Vega has a population of 6,033 people. It is located north of Handen and is part of Stockholm.

As of 2019, Vega is being redeveloped with more than 3,000 planned homes. Vega station on the Stockholm commuter rail system opened on 1 April 2019.

Gallery

References

Populated places in Haninge Municipality
Metropolitan Stockholm